Anonychomyrma longiceps is a species of ant in the genus Anonychomyrma. Described by Forel in 1907, the species is endemic to Australia.

References

Anonychomyrma
Hymenoptera of Australia
Insects described in 1907
Taxa named by Auguste Forel